Marcelo Blessman (born 9 March 1961) is a Brazilian equestrian. He competed in two events at the 1984 Summer Olympics.

References

1961 births
Living people
Brazilian male equestrians
Olympic equestrians of Brazil
Equestrians at the 1984 Summer Olympics
Place of birth missing (living people)